Riza Raquel Santos (born August 31, 1986) is a currently the Vice President of Argyle Fox Inc., a technology firm headquartered in Calgary, Alberta and a former Canadian actress, TV Host and the first Canadian beauty pageant titleholder who achieved the "Canada's Triple Crown": Miss Earth Canada 2006, Miss World Canada 2011 and Miss Universe Canada 2013.

Personal life
Santos was born and raised in Calgary, Alberta. She is of Filipino descent.

As an advocate for environmental protection, Santos worked with the Canadian International Development Agency upon graduating high school. She also served with the Canadian Forces Army Reserve.  Riza attended Rocky Mountain Bible and the University of Calgary's Schulich School of Engineering.

Television experience
During her participation with Pinoy Big Brother: Celebrity Edition 2, she played for Bantay Bata, ABS-CBN Foundation's charitable institution. On Day 84, she was proclaimed the second-place winner of the show. In 2008 and 2009, she hosted the Asian Poker Tour. She has made several other television and film appearances.

Miss Universe Canada 2013
Santos competed at the 2013 edition of Miss Universe Canada held in Toronto where she was hailed 1st Runner up to Denise Garrido. However, 24 hours later, it was later revealed that she originally won due to a typo error in the ratings of the Top 5 entries, which afterwards, significantly impacted the final results of the competition. A week later, she was officially crowned as the new Miss Universe Canada 2013 in her hometown, Calgary, Alberta. This is the first instance of this type of error in the 11 years that Beauties of Canada (BOC) has produced the Miss Universe Canada pageant. Garrido has actually ranked as third runner-up.

Previous pageant experience
She is a Triple National Pageant winner, having gone on to compete in three of the Big Four international beauty pageants. She competed and won Miss Earth Canada 2006, Miss World Canada 2011 and most recently Miss Universe Canada 2013. She competed in the Miss Earth 2006 pageant, in which she was given the Miss Earth Photogenic 2006, Miss Earth Talent 2006 Finalist, 5 Special Awards. She also competed in Miss World 2011 contest, where she placed 30th out of 120 contestants and she also placed 4th in the Sport Talent competition. . She later represented Canada at the Miss Universe 2013 competition in Moscow, Russia.

Filmography

Films

Television

Notes

References

External links

Official Site

1989 births
Actresses from Calgary
Canadian beauty pageant winners
Canadian people of Filipino descent
Canadian female models
Filipino film actresses
Filipino beauty pageant winners
Filipino people of Chinese descent
Filipino people of Spanish descent
Pinoy Big Brother contestants
Filipino television actresses
Filipino female models
Miss Earth 2006 contestants
Miss Universe 2013 contestants
Miss World 2011 delegates
Miss World Canada winners
Star Magic
Living people